Fousseyni Cissé (born 17 July 1989) is a French professional football player of Senegalese and Chadian descent. He also holds Senegalese citizenship and represented Senegal at junior levels before switching to playing for France.

Early life
Cisse's father is from Senegal and his mother was born in Chad.

Club career
Before joining Le Mans, Cissé played as a youth for Olympique Noisy-le-Sec.

He made his professional debut for Le Mans on October 17, 2009 in a Ligue 1 game against Boulogne.

External links
 

1989 births
Footballers from Paris
French sportspeople of Senegalese descent
Living people
French footballers
France youth international footballers
Association football forwards
FC Les Lilas players
Olympique Noisy-le-Sec players
Le Mans FC players
FC Sion players
AC Arlésien players
UE Sant Julià players
Ligue 1 players
Ligue 2 players
Swiss Super League players
French expatriate footballers
Expatriate footballers in Switzerland
Expatriate footballers in Andorra